Ushio & Tora is a Japanese manga series written and illustrated by Kazuhiro Fujita. It follows the adventures of a boy named Ushio Aotsuki, the son of a temple keeper, who after having reluctantly released the imprisoned powerful tiger-like monster, Tora, the two begin a journey together, fighting against supernatural beings threatening the world. It was serialized in Shogakukan's shōnen manga magazine Weekly Shōnen Sunday from January 24, 1990, to October 23, 1996. Shogakukan collected its chapters in thirty-three individual tankōbon volumes, released from November 17, 1990, to December 10, 1996. An additional gaiden volume was released on May 17, 1997.

Shogakukan re-published the series in a nineteen-volume bunkoban edition from September 15, 2004, to March 15, 2006. A twenty-volume kazenban edition was published between May 18, 2015, and December 16, 2016.

Fujita drew a two-chapter short of the series to raise funds for areas devastated by the March 2011 earthquake. These chapters were published in Weekly Shōnen Sunday on December 26, 2012, and January 9, 2013.


Volume list

References

External links
  
 Ushio & Tora at Media Arts Database 

Ushio and Tora